The Chronicles of Huayang or Huayang Guo Zhi is the oldest extant gazetteer of a region of China. It was compiled by Chang Qu during the Jin dynasty. It contains roughly 110,000 characters. Its contents comprise history, geography and biographies of the Sichuan region. It was used by the Liu Song dynasty historian Pei Songzhi in his annotations to the Records of the Three Kingdoms, and by the Tang dynasty prince Li Xian when he wrote his commentaries on the Book of the Later Han.

The Chronicles of Huayang is also rendered in English as:
 Annals of Huayang Country
 Huayang National Annals
 Records of the States South of Mount Hua
 Annals of the Kingdoms South of Mount Hua

Contents
There are twelve chapters in Chronicles of Huayang, the first four are on the history and descriptions of ancient polities of the region, while the following chapters are chronological history of the region from the Later Han to the Cheng Han period, with the last few covering the biographies of notable men and women in the area.

References

External links

  Chronicles of Huayang at archive.org: Volumes 1-3, Volumes 4-6,  Volumes 7-9, Volume 10, Volumes 11-12
 華陽國志:十二卷 at Google Books

Jin dynasty (266–420) literature
Gazetteers
4th-century books
History of Sichuan
History of Chongqing
History of Shaanxi
Geographic history of China